Polla may refer to:

Places
Pölla, a municipality of Zwettl, Lower Austria
Polla, Italy, a town in Salerno, Campania, Italy
Polla, a place in Scotland, see List of listed buildings in Durness, Highland

People
Polla Argentaria, wife of Lucan 
Vespasia Polla, mother of the Roman emperor Vespasian
Vipsania Polla, sister of Marcus Vipsanius Agrippa
Acerronia Polla (died 59 AD), friend of Agrippina the Younger

Surname
Barbara Polla (born 1950), Swiss art writer
Jordi El Niño Polla (born 1994), Spanish pornographic actor
Christian Pollas (born 1947), French astronomer

Other uses
Polla (moth), a genus in the family Geometridae
La Polla Records, a Spanish punk band